KISW (99.9 FM) – branded 99.9 KISW, The Rock of Seattle – is a commercial mainstream rock radio station licensed to Seattle, Washington. Owned by Audacy, Inc., the station serves the Seattle metropolitan area; live shows include The Mens Room afternoon show and the BJ & Migs morning show. Other day parts include Ryan Castle (middays) and Taryn Daly (evenings). The KISW studios are located in Downtown Seattle, while the station transmitter resides on Tiger Mountain in the city of Issaquah. In addition to a standard analog transmission, KISW broadcasts using HD Radio technology, and is available online via Audacy.

History

Classical (1950-1971) 
On January 18, 1950, KISW first signed on the air.  The station's founder and first owner was Ellwood W. Lippincott, who programmed a classical music format.  At first, the station was powered at 2,100 watts, a fraction of its current output.  From 1954 to 1956, the station was managed by Harvey Manning.

Lippincott, a resident of Centralia, Washington, worked as an electrical engineer for Weyerhaeuser. During the week, Lippincott's job required him to travel around the Pacific Northwest maintaining the company's radio equipment, and would spend his weekends managing the station.  Under Lippincott's ownership, KISW operated out of a small studio on the northwest corner of NE 92nd Street and Roosevelt Way NE in North Seattle (9201 Roosevelt Way NE).  The building was demolished and replaced with townhouses in 2007.

In 1969, the station was purchased by Kaye-Smith, a partnership of famed entertainer Danny Kaye and businessman Lester Smith; at that time, Kaye-Smith were also the owners of the leading Top 40 station in Seattle, KJR, and also owned Kaye-Smith Studios in Seattle, where records by Heart, Steve Miller and Bachman–Turner Overdrive were recorded. With Pat O'Day, the firm owned Concerts West, a booking and promotion company that handled Jimi Hendrix, Led Zeppelin, Bad Company, The Eagles, Paul McCartney and others, and were original owners of the Seattle Mariners.

Rock (1971-present) 
With the purchase of KISW, Kaye-Smith decided to switch the station to a format more compatible with KJR.  In 1971, KISW became a progressive rock (or "underground") station, similar to the format pioneered by Tom Donahue at KMPX and KSAN in San Francisco.  KOL-FM was also experimenting with free form rock at night. Over time, KISW moved to an album oriented rock format, by playing the best selling albums from the top rock acts.  In 1982, Danny Kaye sold his interest in the company and the new corporation was called Alexander Broadcasting.  In 1987, Nationwide Communications, a subsidiary of Nationwide Insurance, acquired KISW.  (Nationwide sold off its radio stations by 1997.)

In 1991, as an April Fool's Day prank, the radio station changed its format to soft rock for a day. The station was bought by Entercom Communications in 1996.

In August 2000, the popular "Twisted Radio" morning show led by Bob Rivers left KISW after 11 years to join rival KZOK-FM.  KISW began airing Howard Stern's nationally syndicated show in March 2001 as a replacement.  At the end of 2005, Stern moved to Sirius Satellite Radio.  On January 3, 2006, The BJ Shea Morning Experience (originally from sister station KQBZ) replaced Stern.  Over the years, the station has employed other popular personalities, including Gary Crow, John Langan (who later co-hosted a top-rated morning show on KKZX-FM of Spokane, under the stage name C Foster Kane), Mike West, Robin and Maynard and Steve Slaton.

Programming 
BJ & Migs Mornings co-hosted by B.J. Shea and Steve Migs and their producing team, The Reverend En Fuego, Vicky B., Danny V., Ooh Sara, and Joey Deez. KISW is the originating station for The Mens Room in afternoon drive; hosted by Miles Montgomery, Steve "The Thrill" Hill, Thee Ted Smith and Mike Hawk, the show entered syndication on June 5, 2017 and was distributed by Westwood One until June 2020. Ryan Castle hosts middays, and Taryn Daly hosts evenings.

Weekend programming includes Loud & Local which highlights local music from the greater Seattle area, hosted by Kevin Diers.

The HD2 digital sub-channel broadcasts an active rock format under the brand "Metal Militia".

Awards
In 2007, the station was nominated for the Radio & Records magazine Active Rock station of the year award in a top 25 market; other nominees included WIYY in Baltimore, WAAF in Boston, KBPI in Denver, WRIF in Detroit, and WMMR in Philadelphia. KISW was also nominated for a RadioContraband Rock Radio Award for "Major Market Radio Station of the Year" in 2012.

KISW was inducted into the Rock Radio Hall of Fame in the "Heritage Rock Radio Stations-Still Rocking" in 2014.

KISW won KING-TV's 2019 Best of Western Washington viewers choice poll in the Best Radio Station category.

B.J. Shea was named the 2020 recipient of Morning Show Boot Camp's prestigious 'Kraddick Award' named in honor of the late Kidd Kraddick.

Live Day 
KISW is the flagship station for the 100% live show that happens once a year known as "Live Day". From the commercials and the music to the shows and the sound effects, everything is performed completely LIVE, going by the mantra, "What could possibly go wrong?!" Originating in 2015 and typically in November, KISW pays homage to the earliest days of radio, when every component had to be performed live. In 2017, the station took Live Day on the road to be played out in front of a LIVE audience at various area casinos.

References

External links

1950 establishments in Washington (state)
Active rock radio stations in the United States
Nationwide Communications
Radio stations established in 1950
ISW
Audacy, Inc. radio stations